Ship Bottom is a borough in Ocean County, New Jersey, United States. As of the 2010 United States Census, the borough's population was 1,156, reflecting a decline of 228 (−16.5%) from the 1,384 counted in the 2000 Census, which had in turn increased by 32 (+2.4%) from the 1,352 counted in the 1990 Census. The borough is located on Long Beach Island and borders the Atlantic Ocean. The summer population can be as much as 20,000.

The borough's name derives from an incident in March 1817, in which a woman was saved from a wrecked ship that had flipped over, after her rescuers used axes to cut through the bottom of the hull.

What is now Ship Bottom was originally incorporated as the borough of Ship Bottom-Beach Arlington by an act of the New Jersey Legislature on March 3, 1925, from portions of Long Beach Township, based on the results of a referendum held on May 23, 1925. The borough name was shortened to Ship Bottom in 1947.

The borough is known as the "Gateway to Long Beach Island", as Route 72 provides the sole road access from Manahawkin in Stafford Township, ending in Ship Bottom as it crosses Manahawkin Bay via the Manahawkin Bay Bridge (formally known as the Dorland J. Henderson Memorial Bridge).

Geography
According to the United States Census Bureau, the borough had a total area of 0.99 square miles (2.58 km2), including 0.71 square miles (1.84 km2) of land and 0.28 square miles (0.73 km2) of water (28.48%).

Unincorporated communities, localities and place names located partially or completely within the borough include Beach Arlington.

The borough borders the Ocean County municipalities of Long Beach Township, Stafford Township and Surf City.

Demographics

Census 2010

The Census Bureau's 2006–2010 American Community Survey showed that (in 2010 inflation-adjusted dollars) median household income was $60,673 (with a margin of error of +/− $15,872) and the median family income was $97,841 (+/− $19,072). Males had a median income of $51,641 (+/− $9,381) versus $33,580 (+/− $4,778) for females. The per capita income for the borough was $41,184 (+/− $4,936). About 5.4% of families and 5.2% of the population were below the poverty line, including 6.3% of those under age 18 and 1.9% of those age 65 or over.

Census 2000

As of the 2000 United States Census there were 1,384 people, 664 households, and 395 families residing in the borough. The racial makeup of the borough was 96.32% White, 0.29% African American, 0.72% Native American, 0.87% Asian, 1.08% from other races, and 0.72% from two or more races. Hispanic or Latino of any race were 5.78% of the population.

There were 664 households, out of which 14.3% had children under the age of 18 living with them, 47.3% were married couples living together, 8.0% had a female householder with no husband present, and 40.4% were non-families. 35.8% of all households were made up of individuals, and 17.0% had someone living alone who was 65 years of age or older. The average household size was 2.08 and the average family size was 2.65.

In the borough the population was spread out, with 14.8% under the age of 18, 5.9% from 18 to 24, 22.7% from 25 to 44, 29.7% from 45 to 64, and 26.9% who were 65 years of age or older. The median age was 50 years. For every 100 females, there were 92.8 males. For every 100 females age 18 and over, there were 94.2 males.

The median income for a household in the borough was $42,098, and the median income for a family was $60,417. Males had a median income of $36,382 versus $28,958 for females. The per capita income for the borough was $27,870. About 4.1% of families and 8.2% of the population were below the poverty line, including 15.0% of those under age 18 and 2.8% of those age 65 or over.

Government

Local government
Ship Bottom is governed under the Borough form of New Jersey municipal government, which is used in 218 municipalities (of the 564) statewide, making it the most common form of government in New Jersey. The governing body is comprised of the Mayor and the Borough Council, with all positions elected at-large on a partisan basis as part of the November general election. The Mayor is elected directly by the voters to a four-year term of office. The Borough Council is comprised of six members elected to serve three-year terms on a staggered basis, with two seats coming up for election each year in a three-year cycle. The Borough form of government used by Ship Bottom is a "weak mayor / strong council" government in which council members act as the legislative body with the mayor presiding at meetings and voting only in the event of a tie. The mayor can veto ordinances subject to an override by a two-thirds majority vote of the council. The mayor makes committee and liaison assignments for council members, and most appointments are made by the mayor with the advice and consent of the council.  Each Council member chairs a committee that oversees a department:  Revenue and Finance; Public Safety; Water/Sewer; Parks and Recreation; Public Property and Community Affairs; and Public Works.

, the Mayor of Ship Bottom Borough is Republican William Huelsenbeck, whose term of office ends on December 31, 2022. Members of the Ship Bottom Borough Council are Council President Edward English (R, 2023), Robert J. Butkus (R, 2022), David Hartman (R, 2023), Peter J. Rossi Sr. (R, 2024), Tom Tallon (R, 2022) and Joseph Valyo (R, 2024).

Federal, state and county representation
Ship Bottom is located in the 2nd Congressional District and is part of New Jersey's 9th state legislative district.

 

Ocean County is governed by a Board of County Commissioners comprised of five members who are elected on an at-large basis in partisan elections and serving staggered three-year terms of office, with either one or two seats coming up for election each year as part of the November general election. At an annual reorganization held in the beginning of January, the board chooses a Director and a Deputy Director from among its members. , Ocean County's Commissioners (with party affiliation, term-end year and residence) are:

Commissioner Director John P. Kelly (R, 2022, Eagleswood Township),
Commissioner Deputy Director Virginia E. Haines (R, 2022, Toms River),
Barbara Jo Crea (R, 2024, Little Egg Harbor Township)
Gary Quinn (R, 2024, Lacey Township) and
Joseph H. Vicari (R, 2023, Toms River). Constitutional officers elected on a countywide basis are 
County Clerk Scott M. Colabella (R, 2025, Barnegat Light),
Sheriff Michael G. Mastronardy (R, 2022; Toms River) and
Surrogate Jeffrey Moran (R, 2023, Beachwood).

Politics
As of March 23, 2011, there were a total of 988 registered voters in Ship Bottom, of which 142 (14.4%) were registered as Democrats, 497 (50.3%) were registered as Republicans and 349 (35.3%) were registered as Unaffiliated. There were no voters registered to other parties. Among the borough's 2010 Census population, 85.5% (vs. 63.2% in Ocean County) were registered to vote, including 97.1% of those ages 18 and over (vs. 82.6% countywide).

In the 2012 presidential election, Republican Mitt Romney received 57.3% of the vote (335 cast), ahead of Democrat Barack Obama with 42.4% (248 votes), and other candidates with 0.3% (2 votes), among the 590 ballots cast by the borough's 998 registered voters (5 ballots were spoiled), for a turnout of 59.1%. In the 2008 presidential election, Republican John McCain received 57.2% of the vote (419 cast), ahead of Democrat Barack Obama with 40.3% (295 votes) and other candidates with 1.4% (10 votes), among the 732 ballots cast by the borough's 1,036 registered voters, for a turnout of 70.7%. In the 2004 presidential election, Republican George W. Bush received 57.3% of the vote (449 ballots cast), outpolling Democrat John Kerry with 41.5% (325 votes) and other candidates with 0.6% (7 votes), among the 784 ballots cast by the borough's 1,084 registered voters, for a turnout percentage of 72.3.

In the 2013 gubernatorial election, Republican Chris Christie received 75.3% of the vote (381 cast), ahead of Democrat Barbara Buono with 23.7% (120 votes), and other candidates with 1.0% (5 votes), among the 523 ballots cast by the borough's 967 registered voters (17 ballots were spoiled), for a turnout of 54.1%. In the 2009 gubernatorial election, Republican Chris Christie received 63.2% of the vote (349 ballots cast), ahead of  Democrat Jon Corzine with 29.2% (161 votes), Independent Chris Daggett with 5.8% (32 votes) and other candidates with 0.9% (5 votes), among the 552 ballots cast by the borough's 1,005 registered voters, yielding a 54.9% turnout.

Education

For pre-kindergarten through sixth grade, public school students attend the Long Beach Island Consolidated School District, which also serves students from Barnegat Light, Harvey Cedars, Long Beach Township and Surf City. As of the 2020–2021 school year, the district, comprised of two schools, had an enrollment of 215 students and 30.7 classroom teachers (on an FTE basis), for a student–teacher ratio of 7.0:1. Schools in the district (with 2020–2021 enrollment data from the National Center for Education Statistics) are 
Ethel Jacobsen School in Surf City with 111 students in pre-kindergarten to second grade and 
Long Beach Island Grade School in Ship Bottom with 125 students in grades 3–6. The district's board of education is comprised of nine members who are directly elected from the constituent municipalities on a staggered basis, with three members elected each year. Of the nine seats, one is elected from ShipBottom.

Students in public school for seventh through twelfth grades attend the Southern Regional School District, which serves the five municipalities in the Long Beach Island Consolidated School District, along with students from Beach Haven and Stafford Township, as well as students from Ocean Township (including its Waretown section) who attend as part of a sending/receiving relationship. Schools in the district (with 2020–2021 enrollment data from the National Center for Education Statistics) are 
Southern Regional Middle School with 902 students in grades 7–8 and 
Southern Regional High School with 1,975 students in grades 9–12. Both schools are in the Manahawkin section of Stafford Township.

Transportation

Roads and highways

The eastern terminus of Route 72 is in Ship Bottom, which connects the borough to the Manahawkin section of Stafford Township via the Manahawkin Bay Bridge (formally known as the Dorland J. Henderson Memorial Bridge).

Public transportation
Ocean Ride local service is provided on the OC9 Long Beach Island route.

The LBI Shuttle operates along Long Beach Boulevard, providing free service every 5 to 20 minutes from 10:00 AM to 10:00 PM. It serves the Long Beach Island municipalities / communities of Barnegat Light, Loveladies, Harvey Cedars, North Beach, Surf City, Ship Bottom, Long Beach Township, Beach Haven and Holgate.

Climate

According to the Köppen climate classification system, Ship Bottom, New Jersey has a humid subtropical climate (Cfa) with hot, moderately humid summers, cool winters and year-around precipitation. Cfa climates are characterized by all months having an average mean temperature > 32.0 °F (> 0.0 °C), at least four months with an average mean temperature ≥ 50.0 °F (≥ 10.0 °C), at least one month with an average mean temperature ≥ 71.6 °F (≥ 22.0 °C) and no significant precipitation difference between seasons. During the summer months in Ship Bottom, a cooling afternoon sea breeze is present on most days, but episodes of extreme heat and humidity can occur with heat index values ≥ 95 °F (≥ 35 °C). During the winter months, episodes of extreme cold and wind can occur with wind chill values < 0 °F (< −18 °C). The plant hardiness zone at Ship Bottom Beach is 7a with an average annual extreme minimum air temperature of 3.9 °F (−15.6 °C).

Ecology

According to the A. W. Kuchler U.S. potential natural vegetation types, Ship Bottom, New Jersey would have a dominant vegetation type of Northern Cordgrass (73) with a dominant vegetation form of Coastal Prairie (20).

Notable people

People who were born in, residents of, or otherwise closely associated with Ship Bottom include:

 Wesley Bell (1937–2008), politician who served as Mayor of Stafford Township, New Jersey
 Matt Cook (born 1984), actor known mostly for his roles as Mo McCracken on the TBS sitcom Clipped and as Lowell in the CBS sitcom Man with a Plan
 Zack Hanle (–1999), was a cooking author and journalist who served as an editor of Bon Appetit, in addition to writing books about cooking, diet and exercise
 Matt Kmosko (born 1972), former U.S. soccer defender who played three and a half seasons in Major League Soccer
 Stanley B. Smullen (1906–1998), businessman who served briefly on the Philadelphia City Council

References

External links

 Ship Bottom Borough website
 Long Beach Island School District
 
 School Data for the Long Beach Island School District, National Center for Education Statistics
 Southern Regional School District
 Ship Bottom Volunteer Fire Company Station 46

 
1925 establishments in New Jersey
Borough form of New Jersey government
Boroughs in Ocean County, New Jersey
Jersey Shore communities in Ocean County
Long Beach Island
Populated places established in 1925